Jamshedpur-Ranchi-Hazaribagh-Barhi Highway is a four-lane state highway in Jharkhand constructed on NH 20, NH 43 and Ranchi Ring Road. It was started constructing in 2009 and completed in 2012. It connects Ranchi, capital of Jharkhand, to Hazaribagh in Jharkhand. It is extended up to Ranchi - Jamshedpur Expressway in Jharkhand and Barhi in Jharkhand in 2020 and giving it a length of 231 km. A ten km four-lane bypass has been constructed near Hazaribagh and a 40 km six-lane bypass near Ranchi to decrease the pressure of Traffic in both the cities. It is proposed to be extended to Koderma till 2022.

References
 Company website

Expressways in India
National highways in India
Transport in Ranchi
Roads in Jharkhand